The 2020–21 Continental Cup would have been the 24th edition of the IIHF Continental Cup, Europe's second-tier ice hockey club competition organised by International Ice Hockey Federation. The season was scheduled to begin on 16 October 2020 and the final tournament was scheduled to be played from 8 to 10 January 2021.

The IIHF Council cancelled the tournament during the video conference meeting on August 24, 2020 due to the ongoing COVID-19 pandemic.

Format
Due to the delayed start of the hockey season in many countries due to the COVID-19 pandemic the tournament was about to have different format, consisting of the qualifying round, group stage and final round. In the qualifying round, 8 qualified teams are divided into two groups. The top two teams of each group advance to the group stage. In the group stage, 16 qualified teams and 4 teams that proceeded from the qualifying round are divided into four groups. The winners of each group advance to the final round.

Qualified teams

Qualifying round

Group A
The Group A tournament was scheduled to be played in Akureyri, Iceland, from 16 to 18 October 2020.

Group B
The Group A tournament was scheduled to be played in Sofia, Bulgaria, from 16 to 18 October 2020.

Group stage

Group C
The Group C tournament was scheduled to be played in Amiens, France, from 13 to 15 November 2020.

Group D
The Group D tournament was scheduled to be played in Asiago, Italy, from 13 to 15 November 2020.

Group E
The Group E tournament was scheduled to be played in Ljubljana, Slovenia, from 13 to 15 November 2020.

Group F
The Group F tournament was scheduled to be played in Frederikshavn, Denmark, from 13 to 15 November 2020.

Final round
Continental Cup final tournament was scheduled to be played from 8 to 10 January 2021.

See also
 2020–21 Champions Hockey League

References

IIHF Continental Cup
2020–21 in European ice hockey